Roseann Ambrosia Ketchmark (née Smith; born October 31, 1963) is a United States district judge of the United States District Court for the Western District of Missouri and a former Assistant United States Attorney.

Biography

Ketchmark received a Bachelor of Science in Nursing degree, in 1986, from the University of Oklahoma. She received a Juris Doctor in 1990 from the University of Kansas School of Law. She began her career as an Assistant Prosecutor in Jackson County, Missouri, from 1990 to 1995. From 1995 to 2001, she was First Assistant Prosecutor in Platte County. From 2001 to 2015, she served as an Assistant United States Attorney in the Western District of Missouri. She served as First Assistant United States Attorney from 2001 to 2006 and again from 2009 to 2010. She served as Executive Assistant United States Attorney from 2006 to 2007 and again in 2010. She served in the Fraud and Corruption Unit.

Federal judicial service

On November 20, 2014, President Barack Obama nominated Ketchmark to serve as a United States District Judge of the United States District Court for the Western District of Missouri, to the seat vacated by Judge Gary A. Fenner, who at the time was going to assume senior status on a date to be determined. He eventually assumed senior status after Ketchmark was confirmed on September 8, 2015. On December 16, 2014 her nomination was returned to the President due to the sine die adjournment of the 113th Congress. On January 7, 2015, President Obama renominated her to the same position. She received a hearing on her nomination on March 11, 2015. On April 23, 2015 her nomination was reported out of committee by a voice vote. On September 8, 2015 the U.S. Senate voted in favor of final confirmation by a 96–0 vote. She received her judicial commission on September 14, 2015.

References

External links

1963 births
Living people
Assistant United States Attorneys
Judges of the United States District Court for the Western District of Missouri
Missouri lawyers
United States district court judges appointed by Barack Obama
21st-century American judges
University of Kansas School of Law alumni
University of Oklahoma alumni
21st-century American women judges